Pleah sach ko is a dish of Cambodia. The dish consists of lime and prahok-cured beef salad, sometimes also including beef tripe, tossed with thinly sliced purple Asian shallots, finely shaved radish, crushed roasted peanuts and fresh herbs such as mint and basil. It is very popular at weddings and special occasions.

References

Cambodian cuisine